1137 Raïssa is a stony background asteroid and slow rotator, approximately  in diameter, located in the inner regions of the asteroid belt. It was discovered by Grigory Neujmin at Simeiz Observatory in 1929, and named in memory of Raïssa Maseeva, who worked at the Pulkovo Observatory.

Discovery 

Raïssa was discovered on 27 October 1929, by Soviet astronomer Grigory Neujmin at the Simeiz Observatory on the Crimean peninsula. In the following month, it was independently discovered by German Karl Reinmuth at the Heidelberg Observatory on 21 November 1929. The Minor Planet Center only acknowledges the first discoverer. The asteroid's observation arc begins at the United States Naval Observatory in December 1903, almost 26 years prior to its official discovery observation at Simeiz.

Orbit and classification 

Raïssa is a non-family asteroid of the main belt's background population when applying the hierarchical clustering method to its proper orbital elements. It orbits the Sun in the inner asteroid belt at a distance of 2.2–2.7 AU once every 3 years and 9 months (1,378 days). Its orbit has an eccentricity of 0.10 and an inclination of 4° with respect to the ecliptic.

Naming 

This minor planet was named in memory of Raïssa Izrailevna Maseeva (1900–1930), a scientific collaborator who worked at the Pulkovo Observatory. The official naming citation was mentioned in The Names of the Minor Planets by Paul Herget in 1955.

Physical characteristics 

Raïssa is an assumed stony S-type asteroid.

Slow rotator 

In October 2010, a rotational lightcurve of Raïssa was obtained from photometric observations at the Bigmuskie Observatory , Italy, and the Etscorn Campus and Organ Mesa Observatory  in New Mexico, United States. Lightcurve analysis gave a rotation period of 142.79 hours with a brightness variation of 0.56 magnitude. Previous observations with a shorter period were superseded.

With a rotation period of close to six Earth days, Raïssa is a slow rotator as most asteroids have periods of 20 hours or less. Collaborations of observers located on different longitudes, e.g. in the U.S. and Europe are especially important for asteroids with very long periods. The observers can follow the bodies brightness variation at different starting points and thereby cover parts of the lightcurve that were missed by other observers during their daytime.

Poles 

In 2016, a modeled lightcurve using photometric data from various sources gave a concurring period of  hours and two spin axis of (222.0°, −66°) and (40.0°, −77.0°) in ecliptic coordinates.

Diameter and albedo 

According to the surveys carried out by the Infrared Astronomical Satellite IRAS, the Japanese Akari satellite and the NEOWISE mission of NASA's Wide-field Infrared Survey Explorer, Raïssa measures between 19.421 and 23.69 kilometers in diameter and its surface has an albedo between 0.1592 and 0.228. The Collaborative Asteroid Lightcurve Link derives an albedo of 0.1538 and a diameter of 23.66 kilometers based on an absolute magnitude of 10.78.

References

External links 

 Lightcurve Database Query (LCDB), at www.minorplanet.info
 Dictionary of Minor Planet Names, Google books
 Asteroids and comets rotation curves, CdR – Geneva Observatory, Raoul Behrend
 Discovery Circumstances: Numbered Minor Planets (1)-(5000) – Minor Planet Center
 
 

001137
Discoveries by Grigory Neujmin
Named minor planets
001137
19291027